James T. Oliver (August 18, 1849 – September 12, 1923) was an American marine engineer and politician.

Born in Yorkshire, England, Oliver was educated in Yorkshire. In 1864, Oliver emigrated to the United States. He worked on the railroad in Massachusetts, Rhode Island, New Jersey, and Pennsylvania. In 1872, he moved to De Pere, Wisconsin and worked in the railroad car shops. He then went to Green Bay, Wisconsin and then to Wisconsin Rapids, Wisconsin. Oliver finally returned to Green Bay. He was a marine engineer for many years. From 1921 until his death in 1923, Oliver served in the Wisconsin State Assembly and was a Republican. Oliver died suddenly of a heart attack at his home in Green Bay, Wisconsin.

Notes

1849 births
1923 deaths
English emigrants to the United States
American marine engineers
Politicians from Green Bay, Wisconsin
Republican Party members of the Wisconsin State Assembly